Jumps are performed within a cheerleading routine either for performance factor, or within competitive cheerleading to meet routine requirements and score well. An athlete requires great levels of strength and flexibility as well as power to be able to initiate a jump with enough height and speed to correctly perform shapes in the air.

Jumps are often performed in conjunction with one another, and are linked by a specific and particular arm swing movement to best utilize the height from the previous jump to perform the next. Within a competitive cheerleading routine, the 'jump sequence' is scored by technique and creativity. Choreographers use motions and formations within the jump sequence to increase creativity and performance factor, and can use some unusual arm entries, or dismounts/landings out of jumps to increase this.

Jumps are common in all levels of cheerleading. Different levels have different requirements in regards to execution and difficulty level.  When it comes to school cheerleading, the requirements are set by each state’s cheerleading association.  Contrarily, in college, the college cheerleading association sets the requirements for all Division 1 teams.

Jumps can be performed in any combination desired.  There are more traditional jump sequences like a “double toe touch”, and there are also more unique ones designed to fit a particular routine.

Cheerleading is very inclusive in the fact that these jumps can be so versatile.  There are more low level jumps, explained below, such as the spread eagle and tuck jump. While at the same time, there are complicated jump sequences that can be performed by higher level teams like toe touch to pike.  If the most difficult combinations are becoming easy, tumbling can also be added into the sequence to further complicate the series and school higher difficulty points.

 X Jump/Spread Eagle   You simply prep, swing, and jump with your arms pin a high V and your legs spread apart. Just jump off the ground and it will look like an X. This jump is generally used to practice group timing who and snapping legs down from a jump.
 Pencil/T/Straight Jump  This jump is probably the most simple jump. It involves being completely straight with your arms in T-motion or in a point above your head. This jump is usually the first you would learn. Mainly used for correcting the body position from the torso down to the toes for learning the main jumps. This is commonly used with younger cheerleaders too.
 Toe-Touch  The most recognisable cheerleading jump, very similar to what is known in gymnastics as a 'straddle' jump. In this jump, the legs are straddled and straight, parallel to the ground,  toes pointed, knees are pointing up/backwards, and your hands are in fists or blades and arms in a "T" motion. Despite its name, you do not touch your toes during a toe touch, you reach out farther in front of your legs. Keep your back straight and bring your legs up to you - the aim is to create a hyperextension with your hips, and cheerleaders spend lots of time strengthening their hip flexor muscles and movements to perform this jump well. This is the most common cheer jump.
 Tuck  A jump in which the cheerleader uses their stomach muscles to pull the legs up with their thighs as close to the chest as possible, knees facing upward as if in a tucked position.
 Hurdler  The straight leg is either forward (a front hurdler) with arms in candlesticks, or out to the side (a side hurdler) with arms in a T. The bent knee faces the crowd in a side hurdler and the ground in a front hurdler. 
 Right hurdler a right hurdler is basically the same as a hurdler you're just facing the right, and the same with left side.
 Pike  This jump is among the most difficult of jumps. Both legs are straight out, knees locked. Arms are in a touchdown motion out in front to create a folded position in the air, this motion is also called "candlesticks". This is often performed at a ninety-degree angle to the audience in order to show off the air position. 
 Around the World  The Around the World, or the pike-out, is a jump where the performer hits a pike and then whips his or her legs quickly back around into a toe touch. This jump is regarded as difficult to accomplish, because two positions must be reached in the very short time while the jumper is in the air. Not commonly used, as it is so difficult to perform well.
 Herkie  Named for Lawrence R. Herkimer, the founder of the National Cheerleaders Association, this jump is similar to a side-hurdler, except that instead of both arms being in a "T" shaped motion, both arms are opposite of what the leg beneath them is doing.  Example of this would be the straight arm would be on the side of the bent leg, and the bent arm is on the side of the straight leg.  One other variation of this includes the bent leg is pointing straight down, instead of out like the side-hurdler.  The jump is speculated to have been invented because Herkie was not able to do an actual side-hurdler.
 Left Side the leg to the audience is tucked in while the other is out.
 Right side same as left also turn the left/right while approaching the jump
 Cheer leader jump This jump is commonly used in cheer leading and on a dance team, you typically will have your arms up in a "V" above your head and then rotate one of your arms backwards and right after kick one of your legs up and pointed straight in the direction of your face. 
 Double Hook  A jump where the legs are in the "cheer sit" position.
 Double Jump  This is the name for when one performs any jump twice in a row.
 Triple Jump This is the name for any jump with three jumps in a row connected by the "swing". This is most commonly used among the elite divisions.
 Jump combination The official name for a series of jumps.
 Power Jump  A jump where there is no swinging of the arms in preparation for the jump. All the power for the jump comes from the legs. This jump is also known as a "Dip Jump."
Turntable A jump where the cheerleader's legs are up and are rotated from side to side while the arms are swished back and forth.

 Jump Tumbling The level you're competing at determines the difficulty of the tumbling element out of the jump. Toe-touch jumps (or any jump) can be immediately followed by a back handspring (Level 3), back tuck (Level 4+), standing full (Level 5+). Or front tumbling can be performed out of a jump, for example to front walkover, front handspring, aerial, etc. however this is less common. There are multiple elements to be chosen out of a jump. Level 4 from USASF is the first level that includes a jump to back tuck. These are scored as 'standing tumbles' and are prestigious as they are often performed by the majority to most of the team at once, and are a classic and recognizable feature of a high level routine.

See also 
List of cheerleading stunts
Cheerleading

References

Cheerleading
Jumping sports